John Bernard "Jack" Gaffney OAM (21 August 1929 – 1 August 2018) was an Australian rules footballer who played with Fitzroy in the Victorian Football League (VFL).		

Originally from Broken Hill, Gaffney played for and coached Prahran in the Victorian Football Association (VFA) after retiring from the VFL. He later became a lawyer, and was the Supreme Court of Victoria Registrar of Criminal Appeals, a Master; and Registrar of the Court of Appeal. He also served on the VFL Tribunal.

Notes

External links 
		

1929 births
2018 deaths
Australian rules footballers from New South Wales
Fitzroy Football Club players
South Broken Hill Football Club players
Lawyers from Melbourne
Recipients of the Medal of the Order of Australia
Prahran Football Club coaches
Prahran Football Club players